South Galway Station and often referred to as South Galway and also once known as Galway Downs is a pastoral lease that operates as a cattle station.

Description

It is currently owned by the Australian Agricultural Company. Situated along Cooper Creek approximately half the property is flooded river country and about one quarter is rolling downs. The remaining quarter is a mix of spinifex, red sand, mulga and hard hilly country.

History
Initially established by Patrick and Michael Durack along with John Costello in 1873, the property was one of the first to be settled in the region. the area was struck by drought from 1897 to 1901.

The property sold in about 1884 to the Queensland Cooperative Pastoral Company who placed it on the market when it went into liquidation along with several other properties including Thylungra, Buckingham Downs and Pikedale in 1886.

The property was purchased by the Schmidt family in 1937. In 1945 the station was hit by a rat plague which consumed six months worth of feed. The plague extended through the Cooper Country from Windorah to Durham Downs.

In 1951 a pilot from Trans Australia Airlines was hired by the station owner to ride the range in a de Havilland Dragon to rescue a mob of cattle threatened by floods. All the cattle but 300 were driven to higher ground saving the owner £10,000. Bushfires ravaged the station later the same year with an area of over  being burnt out, stockmen from South Galway were at the fire front for five days in an attempt to control the blaze.

See also
List of ranches and stations
List of the largest stations in Australia

References

Stations (Australian agriculture)
Pastoral leases in Queensland
South West Queensland
1873 establishments in Australia